Solute carrier family 38 member 9 is a protein that in humans is encoded by the SLC38A9 gene.

References

Further reading